St. Scholastica Academy (SSA) is a private, Roman Catholic, all-girls high school in Covington, Louisiana.  It is located in the Roman Catholic Archdiocese of New Orleans.

Background
The SSA was established in 1903 by the Benedictine Sisters. St. Scholastica was St. Benedict's twin sister. St Scholastica's foundation is based on four pillars. These four pillars are located in front of the school's entrance. SSA offers Honors, Advanced Placement, and Dual Enrollment courses.

History 
In 1902 ground was broken in the building of a new school, St. Scholastica Academy. September 4, 1903, the large bell suspended above the new wooden four-story building rang for the first time.
In 2016, Benedictine Hall was transformed into a STEM Building, to configure new science and math classrooms. In August 2019, Angelus Hall, a STEM classroom building holding a Mac Lab, TV Production Studio, 7 classrooms for Math & Theology departments, and 1 science lab was completed. Angelus Hall is connected to Benedictine Hall; the construction of Angelus Hall also came with the 10s, 20s, and 30s classroom buildings being demolished as they were outdated and no longer met students' needs.

Athletics
St. Scholastica Academy athletics competes in the LHSAA.

Associated schools
St. Paul's School

Notes and references

Catholic secondary schools in Louisiana
Catholic secondary schools in New Orleans
Girls' schools in Louisiana
Schools in St. Tammany Parish, Louisiana
Educational institutions established in 1903
1903 establishments in Louisiana